Band Astaneh (also Romanized as Band Āstāneh) is a village in Hombarat Rural District, in the Central District of Ardestan County, Isfahan Province, Iran. At the 2006 census, its population was 22, in 6 families.

References 

Populated places in Ardestan County